The discography of Super Furry Animals, a Welsh indie rock band, consists of nine studio albums, four extended plays, twenty three singles and three video albums. Super Furry Animals were formed in 1993 in Cardiff, Wales by Gruff Rhys (lead vocals, guitar), Huw Bunford (lead guitar, vocals), Guto Pryce (bass guitar), Cian Ciaran (keyboards, synthesizers, various electronics, occasional guitar, vocals) and Dafydd Ieuan (drums, vocals).

Studio albums

Compilation albums

Extended plays

Singles

Notes
A ^ Issued as a free download single from the band's official website.
B ^ Radio only single made available to listen to free online from the band's official website before the release of Dark Days/Light Years.

Video albums

Music videos

Additionally, the album Rings Around the World was released with low-budget videos accompanying each track.

Miscellaneous

Songs

The following songs by Super Furry Animals appear on compilation albums but were not issued as singles or included on a studio album by the band.

Collaborations

Remixes

Mixtapes

The following albums feature tracks by other artists chosen by one or more of the Super Furry Animals.

References
General

 [ Discography]. Allmusic. Retrieved 2 July 2009.

Specific

External links
Official website

Discography
Discographies of British artists
Super Furry Animals